The Miyapur Metro Station is located on the Red Line of the Hyderabad Metro. The Miyapur  Metro Station is terminal point of Corridor I.  L&THMRL has set up free wifi access units for commuters at Miyapur metro station, in association with ACT Fibernet, as part of a pilot project.

History
It was opened on 29 November 2017.

The station

Structure
Miyapur elevated metro station situated on the Red Line of Hyderabad Metro.

Facilities

Station layout
Street Level This is the first level where passengers may park their vehicles and view the local area map.

Concourse level Ticketing office or Ticket Vending Machines (TVMs) is located here. Retail outlets and other facilities like washrooms, ATMs, first aid, etc., will be available in this area.

Platform level  This layer consists of two platforms. Trains takes passengers from this level.

Connections

Bus
Telangana State Road Transport Corporation bus routes number 16A/219, 18/219, 19/224, 19K/224, 19M/218, 19M/224, 22/219L, 24S/219, 31X, 113EL, 113K/255L, 113K/L, 113KL, 195, 195D, 218, 218/19M, 218C, 218D, 218D/L, 218L, 218L/V, 219, 219/229, 223JG, 224/205F, 224/226, 225L, 225L/299, 225L/V, 226, 226A, 226L/229 serves the station .

See also

References

External links

Hyderabad Metro Rail Ltd
 UrbanRail.Net – descriptions of all metro systems in the world, each with a schematic map showing all stations.

Hyderabad Metro stations
2017 establishments in Telangana
Railway stations in India opened in 2017